Tauqir Zia is a Pakistani former military officer and administrator who was the Chairman of the Pakistan Cricket Board (PCB) between 1999 and 2003.

In December 2003, he resigned from the chairmanship of the Pakistan Cricket Board.

Military career
Lieutenant general Tauqir Zia served as Director General Military Operations during the Kargil War in 1999 with India.  When General Pervez Musharraf overthrew Prime Minister Nawaz Sharif on 12 October 1999, he was serving as the Corps Commander Mangla, which is considered to be a key post in Pakistan's military circles after the 'Corps Commander Rawalpindi'.

Sports career
During Pervez Musharraf regime, he was appointed chairman, Pakistan Cricket Board in 1999. He resigned in 2003 after a controversy when his son, Junaid Zia, was inducted in the Pakistan national cricket team.

References

Year of birth missing
Place of birth missing
Pakistan Cricket Board Presidents and Chairmen
Pakistani generals